was a town located in Kawachi District, Tochigi Prefecture, Japan.

As of 2003, the town had an estimated population of 35,247 and a density of 738.62 persons per km2. The total area was 47.72 km2.

On March 31, 2007, Kawachi, along with the town of Kamikawachi (also from Kawachi District), was merged into the expanded city of Utsunomiya.

Dissolved municipalities of Tochigi Prefecture